N. indica may refer to:
 Nepenthes indica, a synonym for Nepenthes distillatoria, a plant species
 Nesokia indica, the short-tailed bandicoot rat, a rodent species

See also
 Indica (disambiguation)